Agyneta unimaculata is a species of sheet weaver found in Canada and the United States. It was described by Banks in 1892.

References

unimaculata
Spiders of North America
Spiders described in 1892